Stary Pawłów  is a village in the administrative district of Gmina Janów Podlaski, within Biała Podlaska County, Lublin Voivodeship, in eastern Poland, close to the border with Belarus.

References

Villages in Biała Podlaska County
Siedlce Governorate
Kholm Governorate
Lublin Voivodeship (1919–1939)